The 23rd Street station was a station on the demolished IRT Sixth Avenue Line in Manhattan, New York City. It had two tracks and two side platforms. It was served by trains from the IRT Sixth Avenue Line. This station opened on June 5, 1878 and closed on December 4, 1938. The next southbound stop was 18th Street. The next northbound stop was 28th Street. Two years later the rapid transit needs of the intersection were replaced by the underground 23rd Street IND subway station.

References

IRT Sixth Avenue Line stations
Railway stations closed in 1938
Former elevated and subway stations in Manhattan
1938 disestablishments in New York (state)

Sixth Avenue
23rd Street (Manhattan)
Railway stations in the United States opened in 1878
1878 establishments in New York (state)